Opera San José is an American opera company founded in 1984 by Irene Dalis (1925-2014) based in San Jose, California.

History

Opera San José was founded in 1984 by mezzo-soprano singer Irene Dalis (1925-2014), who directed the company for 30 years until her retirement in 2014. In 1988 it formed a residency of principal artists that would perform in all productions, modeled after traditional European opera companies. The company purchased two apartment buildings to provide the artists with housing rent-free. Initially performances took place in the Montgomery Theater in San Jose's Civic Auditorium complex until 2004 when productions moved to the newly-restored historical California Theatre.

Larry Hancock, who had served with the organization for many years, became General Director in 2014. Hancock announced his retirement in April 2019, introducing arts administrator Khori Dastoor as his successor. Joseph Marcheso has been the music director and Principal Conductor since 2014.

In June 2021, Dastoor was selected to become the next General Director and CEO of Houston Grand Opera  (beginning in January 2022), taking the helm of one of the country's largest opera companies. Opera San José announced the appointment of nationally acclaimed opera and theater director Shawna Lucey as its new General Director and CEO in December 2021. Lucey's appointment as the fourth General Director in Opera San José's history will begin in January 2022, midway through the company's 38th season, overseeing the productions of Bizet's Carmen and Bernstein's West Side Story, as well as the return of the Irene Dalis Vocal Competition.

Following cancellations in 2020-21 due to COVID, the company's 2021–22 season kicked off in September 2021 with the digital production of Rimsky-Korsakov's Mozart and Salieri, starring baritones Sidney Outlaw (Salieri) and Simon Barrad (Mozart). A month later, the company made its triumphant return to the California Theatre with a new production of Purcell's baroque masterpiece, Dido and Aeneas. Casting for this celebrated work included mezzo-soprano Nikola Printz as Dido, baritone Efraín Solís as Aeneas, soprano Maya Kherani as Belinda, bass-baritone Nathan Stark as the Sorcerer, and dancers from San José Dance Theatre. Opera San José's return to in-person performances was met with great success, with the San Francisco Chronicle calling the production, “Exquisite. Heart-rending, thrillingly fierce. Magnificent.”

In June 2020, Opera San José unveiled its plans to create the Heiman Digital Media Studio, a new performance/film space that enables the company to stream high-quality, fully produced operatic performances into the living room of patrons. On July 11, 2020, Opera San José launched its Digital Media Studio series with virtual performances of Robert Schumann's Dichterliebe ('A Poet's Love') song cycle performed by Resident Artist baritone Eugene Brancoveanu and Resident Artist conductor Christopher James Ray on piano. The virtual performance was offered with Spanish and Vietnamese translations, in addition to English, welcoming two of San Jose's largest communities to experience its local art. The company saw this performance, the first in its Digital Media Studio series, as one of the many opportunities to make the work it produces more widely available.

A few months later, in December 2020, Opera San José presented a new fully staged production of Jake Heggie's chamber opera, Three Decembers, featuring world-renowned mezzo-soprano Susan Graham in the central role, alongside celebrated Opera San José Resident Artists soprano Maya Kherani and baritone Efraín Solís. Filmed in the Heiman Digital Media studio and available via digital stream, this production of Three Decembers was praised by the San Francisco Chronicle as “Skillful, makes chamber opera sparkle online. Buoyant. Elegant. A knockout.”

Virtual offerings that followed Three Decembers included: Opera San José's virtual New Year's Eve celebration, The Parting Glass (Dec. 2020); Love & Secrets: A Domestic Trilogy (April 2021); Sing For Your Supper! (May 2021); and The Parting Glass Part 2: Back to the Bar! (Dec. 2021).

The Heiman Digital Media Studio was made possible by a generous lead donation from Opera San José trustee Peggy Heiman in honor of her late husband, devoted Opera San José supporter Fred Heiman.  

Throughout the COVID-19 pandemic, Opera San José has remained tirelessly inventive in finding ways to keep its artists working, the company together, and its community well-served – from creating one of the nation's first artist and musician relief funds at the outset of the pandemic to pioneering the production of digital programming for safe at-home viewing from the cutting-edge Heiman Digital Media Studio.

California Theatre
On September 18, 2004, Opera San José opened its debut season in the California Theatre. The 1,100-seat auditorium joined the select ranks of the world's most intimate opera houses. The California Theatre was originally a magnificent 1927 vaudeville and film house that closed its doors in 1973. After reconstruction and restoration, the California Theatre was returned to use as one of the region's most important performance facilities.

Resident company
Opera San José is unique with its resident company of principal artists. These artists, in the first years of their careers, are identified and awarded annual contracts to perform leading roles in mainstage productions and to participate in school and community-wide educational activities. These singers are groomed for international performing careers. Due to the resident nature of the company, modeled after the German regional opera company, these artists build substantial professional repertoire, are coached by resident and guest conductors and stage directors, and are prepared to meet the demands of a successful operatic career.

Operations
To date Opera San José has presented 150 opera productions, including five world premieres among the 64 titles in its repertoire. Notable productions include the American premiere of Alma Deutcher's Cinderella (2017), Jake Heggie's Moby-Dick (2019), and the large-scale production of Mozart's Idomeneo: ré di Creta (2011) jointly produced with the Packard Humanities.

The number of K-12 educational performances has exceeded 2,300. Community programming for adult audiences totals some 3,200 performances. Between all areas of programming, the company reached approximately 113,000 in its last complete season (2018-2019).

Opera San José has never incurred debt and has received consistent four-star ratings from Charity Navigator for its record of responsible fiscal management.

Opera San José is funded by the city of San José and has had many major corporations and foundations as donors including Applied Materials, Packard Humanities Institute, Hewlett Foundation, David and Lucile Packard Foundation, Getty Foundation, and many others.

References

External links
 Opera San José

California opera companies
Musical groups from San Jose, California
Culture of San Jose, California
Musical groups established in 1984
Weeks and Day buildings